A uniform is a standard set of clothing identifying the wearer as a member of an organisation.

Uniform may also refer to:

Clothing
 Baseball uniform
 Military uniform, often simply "uniform", worn by members of a military organisation
 School uniform, also known as "student uniform" or simply "uniform", mandated clothing for students in a particular school or school system

Music and film
 Uniform (band), American rock band
 Uniform (film) is the title of a 2003 film by director Diao Yi'nan 
 "Uniform", a song by Joe Beagle
 "Uniform", a track on British band Bloc Party's album A Weekend in the City
 "Uniform", a 1982 single by Icehouse, from the album Primitive Man
 "Uniform", a 1994 single by Inspiral Carpets, from the album Devil Hopping

Mathematics and physics

 Uniform circular motion, in physics
 Uniform continuity of a function is a property stronger than ordinary continuity
 Uniform convergence of an infinite sequence of functions is a type of convergence stronger than pointwise convergence
 Uniform distribution (continuous)
 Uniform distribution (discrete)
 Uniform limit theorem
 Uniform property, concept in topology
 Uniform space, concept in topology

Other uses
 Uniform, the phonetic code word for the letter "U" as part of the NATO phonetic alphabet

See also 
 Uniformity (disambiguation)